Leprodera elongata is a species of beetle in the family Cerambycidae. It was described by James Thomson in 1857. It is known from Malaysia, Borneo, Java and Sumatra.

References

Lamiini
Beetles described in 1857